Juan José Chuquisengo is a Peruvian concert pianist and soloist, specializing in classical and world music. Chuquisengo's Trascendent Journey was considered one of the "best 100 classic CDs ever" by Die Besten 100, and Chuquisengo received a fellowship award from the Kennedy Center for the Performing Arts.

Early life and career 
Chuquisengo was born in Peru, where he taught himself how to play music by sound. He studied at a local conservatory, eventually traveling to Europe and meeting conductor Sergiu Celibidache, who became his mentor. Chuquisengo studied under Celibidache for seven years in Germany, Italy and France and then relocated to New York City. Chuquisengo studied composition, orchestral conducting, philosophy and arts, and explored Improvisation in the area of World Music. He frequently tours Europe, America and Asia and teaches at universities and music institutions. He was invited in November 2012 by the Barenboim Foundation to teach at the Orchestral Academy in Seville.

Personal life 
Chuquisengo lives in Munich, Germany. He holds a black belt in Karate-Do and teaches Karate, Kung Fu and Tai Chi.

Discography 
His works include:

 Piano Recital 
 Piano Recital II 
 Maurice Ravel: Piano Works
 Transcendent Journey

References

External links 
 Official Website

Peruvian classical pianists
Year of birth missing (living people)
Living people
21st-century classical pianists